The 2009–10 season was Sloboda's last season in Serbian League West before merging with Sevojno in the summer of 2010.This was also their last season playing at the old Užice City Stadium.

Fixtures

League table

References

FK Sloboda Užice
Sloboda Uzice